Patersonia argyrea is a species of plant in the iris family Iridaceae and is endemic to Western Australia. It is a tufted perennial herb with linear, sword-shaped leaves and violet tepals.

Description
Flowering mainly occurs from September to November.

Taxonomy and naming
Patersonia argyrea was first described in 1984 by David Alan Cooke in the journal Nuytsia, from specimens collected by Charles Austin Gardner on Mount Lesueur in 1946. The specific epithet (argyrea) is derived from the Latin word argyreus meaning "silvery", referring to the hairs on the foliage.

Distribution and habitat
This patersonia grows in heath on sandy soil and is only known from near Mount Lesueur in the Geraldton Sandplains Biogeographic region of south-western Western Australia.

Conservation status
Patersonia argyrea is listed as "Priority Three" by the Government of Western Australia Department of Biodiversity, Conservation and Attractions, meaning that it is poorly known and known from only a few locations but is not under imminent threat.

References

argyrea
Flora of Western Australia
Plants described in 1984